University of Wales, Lampeter, originally known as St David's College and later St David's University College, was the oldest degree-awarding institution in Wales. Its alumni include politicians, bishops, writers, activists, and academics. It was founded in 1822 by Thomas Burgess, Bishop of St Davids, and given its royal charter by George IV in 1828. The college was originally intended for the teaching of Welsh male clergy, with a 1927 report estimating that 66% of Welsh clergy had received some amount of training in Lampeter. It later began teaching a range of subjects.

From the world of clergy, the college's alumni include seven Archdeacons (George Austin, Carl Cooper, Owen Evans, Judy French, John Griffiths, John Holliman and Lawrence Thomas), several bishops, and one Archbishop of Wales (Alwyn Rice Jones). The list of educators includes a President of Washington & Jefferson College (John C. Knapp) and a Vice-Chancellor of Edge Hill University (John Cater). Academics who studied at the college went on to teach at University College Cork (Graham Allen), Oxford Brookes University (William Gibson), Wuhan University (James R. Lewis), and St David's College itself (William Henry Harris, Dic Edwards and Daniel Silvan Evans). The list of alumni also includes one member of the Senedd (Rhodri Glyn Thomas), a founding member of the Social Democratic Party (Sue Slipman), a polar explorer (Hannah McKeand), and several writers and poets (Ian Marchant, E. A. Markham, Adrian Mourby, Peter Paphides and Fred Secombe).

In 1965, the college began accepting female students for the first time. It was renamed St David's University College in 1971 after joining the federal University of Wales, and in 1996 renamed again to University of Wales, Lampeter. In 2010, the college merged with Trinity University College to form the University of Wales Trinity Saint David.

Alumni
Abbreviations used in the following table
 E – Year of enrolment at St David's College/University of Wales
 G – Year of graduation/conclusion of study at St David's College/University of Wales
 ? – Year or degree unknown

Degree abbreviations
BA – Bachelor of Arts
BD – Bachelor of Divinity
LTh – Licentiate of Theology
MA – Master of Arts
PhD – Doctor of Philosophy
DLitt – Doctor of Letters

Clergy

Other religious leaders

Educators

Academics

Broadcasters and entertainers

Politicians

Social activists

Sports people

Explorers

Writers and artists

See also
List of vice-chancellors of the University of Wales, Trinity Saint David
List of academics of University of Wales, Lampeter

References

Alumni of the University of Wales, Lampeter
Wales, Lampeter